The following is an episode list for the children's animated television series Danger Mouse. The show is about the title character of the same name (David Jason) and his sidekick Ernest Penfold (Terry Scott) defeating villains who attempt to cause havoc around the planet.

The show was made by Cosgrove Hall Films and first shown on ITV during its weekday lunchtime or afternoon children's programming. 161 episodes were made which were broadcast between 1981 and 1992. Later, VHS and DVD releases edited the 5-part stories together as single episodes, to total 89 episodes. The episode order is controversial because stories were often initially transmitted some years after the rest of the season to which they theoretically belonged, often forming part of a 'repeats season'. The US Region 1 DVD releases present the episodes in the UK broadcast order.

Series overview

Episodes

Series 1 (1981) 
Series 1 episodes are 11 minutes each, and originally aired on Mondays and Wednesdays with no commercial breaks in the UK.

Series 2 (1982) 
Series 2 stories were originally each aired in five 5-minute segments over five consecutive days. VHS and DVD releases usually see these episodes edited together as one 25-minute episode, although in reality, these omnibus episodes run closer to 17–19 minutes as they lose David Jason's 'cliffhanger' narration over the "To be continued..." captions. On the VHS and DVD releases, the "Episode 1" suffix in the title card after the opening credits has often been left unaltered. The UK version compresses them to 11 minutes, but the US DVD releases retain the original 5-min segment format.

Series 3 (1982) 
The first three stories were originally each aired in five 5-minute segments over five consecutive days. The US DVD releases retain the original 5-min segment format. The fourth and fifth stories were single 11-minute segments and aired on Mondays; some sources (including iTunes UK and The Guinness Book of Classic British TV) list these episodes as belonging to the first series. This would appear to be supported by the fact that these final two episodes have the series 1 credit sequence with its original title card and the same series 1 animation. (The title card was changed to the more familiar logo from series 2 onwards.) According to the production codes, this is still technically series 2.

Series 4 (1983) 
Series 4 stories were originally each aired in five 5-minute segments over five consecutive days. This series was the longest-lived with 45 episodes. VHS and DVD releases usually see these episodes edited together as one 25-minute episode, although in reality, these omnibus episodes run closer to 20 minutes as they lose David Jason's 'cliffhanger' narration over the "To be continued..." captions. On the VHS and DVD releases, the "Episode 1" suffix in the title card after the opening credits has often been left unaltered. The US DVD releases retain the original 5-min segment format.

Series 5 (1984) 
Series 5 episodes are about 10 minutes each, and originally aired on Mondays with no commercial breaks.

Series 6 (1984–85) 
Series 6 episodes are 10 minutes each, and originally aired on Thursdays with no commercial breaks (except for the first episode, which aired on a Tuesday). 19 of the episodes (Once Upon A Timeslip and 18 other episodes) show the copyright year as 1984, although for eight episodes ("Viva Danger Mouse", "Hear! Hear!", "Multiplication Fable", "The Spy Who Stayed in With a Cold", "Alping is Snow Easy Matter", "One of Our Stately Homes is Missing", "Ee-Tea!" and "Tut, Tut, it's Not Pharaoh!") the year is shown as 1983.

Series 7 (1986) 
Series 7 episodes are 25 minutes each, and originally aired on Thursdays. The U.S. advertised these as specials that aired monthly, but the VHS and DVD releases consider them to be Series 7.

Series 8 (1987) 
Series 8 episodes were 10 minutes each, and originally aired on Fridays with no commercial breaks. This series was the shortest-lived with just two episodes. Some sources such as the book 'The Guinness Book of Classic British TV' by Paul Cornell et al. list these episodes as theoretically belonging to the fifth or sixth series. It states that some episodes were often held back and not broadcast until years later as part of a repeats season. This would seem to be supported by the copyright information in the end credits, as both are dated 1983 (as per series 5 episodes and some Series 6 episodes).

Series 9 (1991) 
Series 9 episodes were 22 minutes each and originally aired on Thursdays. The show's appearance changed noticeably with this series, now brighter and with altered artwork – most notably to Danger Mouse himself.  Jimmy Hibbert is added to the voice cast. Like Series 7, the U.S. aired these as specials monthly, but the VHS and DVD releases consider them Series 9.

Series 10 (1992) 
Series 10 episodes were 22 minutes each, and originally aired on Thursdays with no commercial breaks. The book 'The Guinness Book of Classic British TV' by Paul Cornell et al. lists these episodes as a continuation of the ninth series. This was the final series of the show's original run.

Notes
 The first 4 series were all dated 1980.
 Series 5 was dated 1983.
 For the syndicated market, notably for Nickelodeon, the first 5 series were all dated 1984.
 Series 7 was dated 1985.
 Series 9 and Series 10 were dated 1990.
 At the end of the 7th, 9th & 10th series, the copyright under the DM logo has changed to COSGROVE HALL PRODUCTIONS instead of the usual 'A Cosgrove Hall Production' logo with a copyright under that caption.

References

External links
 

Danger Mouse (1981 TV series)
Danger Mouse